Botiidae is a family of cypriniform ray-finned fishes from South, Southeast, and East Asia. Until recently they were placed in the true loach family Cobitidae, until Maurice Kottelat revised the loaches and re-elevated this taxon to family rank in 2012. The family includes about 56 species.

The Botiids are more robust than most of their relatives in Cobitidae and tend to have a more or less arched back, yielding an altogether more fusiform shape. Botiids typically have a pointed snout of intermediate length, while many cobitids are remarkably stub-nosed.

Botiids are generally fairly small, with maximum lengths between  depending on the species involved, although Leptobotia elongata reaches  (Chromobotia macracanthus has been claimed to reach a similar size, but this would be exceptional).

As aquarium fish
Many of the more brightly colored species are popular with freshwater aquarists, so are of importance in the aquarium trade. Botiidae often encountered in aquarium trade include:
 Clown loach, Chromobotia macracanthus
 Red-finned loach, Yasuhikotakia modesta
 Dwarf loach, Ambastaia sidthimunki
 Skunk loach, Yasuhikotakia morleti
 Yoyo loach, Botia almorhae
 Zebra loach, B. striata
 Bengal loach, B. dario
 Burmese border loach, B. kubotai

References
 Kottelat, M. (2004): Botia kubotai, a new species of loach (Teleostei: Cobitidae) from the Ataran River basin (Myanmar), with comments on botiine nomenclature and diagnosis of a new genus. Zootaxa 401: 1-18. PDF abstract and first page image
 Tang, Qiong-ying; Yu, Dan & Liu, Huan-zhang (2008): 斑纹薄鳅 (Leptobotia zebra) 应该为斑纹沙鳅 (Sinibotia zebra) ["Leptobotia zebra Should Be Revised as Sinibotia zebra (Cypriniformes-Botiidae)"]. Zoological Research 29(1): 1-9 [Chinese with English abstract]. PDF fulltext

 
Ray-finned fish families
Taxa named by Lev Berg